Carmen is a 1926 French silent drama film directed by Jacques Feyder and starring Raquel Meller, Fred Louis Lerch and Gaston Modot. It is based on Prosper Mérimée's 1845 Seville-set novel Carmen.

The film's art direction was by Lazare Meerson.

Cast
 Raquel Meller as Carmen  
 Fred Louis Lerch as José Lizarrabengoa  
 Gaston Modot as García 'El Tuerto'  
 Jean Murat as Officier  
 Victor Vina as Le Dancaire  
 Guerrero de Xandoval as Lucas, le picador  
 Charles Barrois as Lillas Pastia  
 Georges Lampin as Contrebandier  
 Raymond Guérin-Catelain as Duc d'El Chorbas  
 Andrée Canti as Une femme 
 Luis Buñuel as Contrebandier chez lillas pastia  
 Pedro de Hidalgo as El Remendado 
 Arthur Duarte 
 Charles Morat as Officier  
 Joaquim Peindo as Guitar player  
 Hernando Vines as Guitar player  
 Roy Wood as Officier anglais

References

Bibliography
 Zanger, Anat. Film Remakes as Ritual and Disguise: From Carmen to Ripley. Amsterdam University Press, 2006.

External links

Carmen de Jacques Feyder archived article in French

1926 films
Films directed by Jacques Feyder
French silent feature films
1920s historical drama films
French historical drama films
Films set in the 19th century
Films set in Seville
Films based on Carmen
Films scored by Ernesto Halffter
French black-and-white films
1926 drama films
Films about Romani people
Luis Buñuel
Silent drama films
1920s French films